Derrykeighan is a hamlet, civil parish and townland (of 161 acres) in County Antrim, Northern Ireland, 4 miles (7.5 km) north of Ballymoney. It is situated in the historic barony of Dunluce Lower.

History
The site of the medieval parish church, and also of an early church, is marked by the ruins of a later church in Derrykeighan.

Civil parish of Derrykeighan
The civil parish covers includes the village of Dervock.

Townlands
The civil parish contains the following townlands:

Aghancrossy
Ballydivity
Ballyhibistock Lower
Ballyhibistock Upper
Ballynafeigh
Ballynarry Upper
Ballyratahan
Ballyratahan
Beerhill
Bellisle
Carnaff
Carncoggy
Carncullagh Lower
Carncullagh Middle
Carncullagh Upper
Carnfeogue
Carracloghy
Chathamhall
Coole
Deepstown
Derrykeighan
Dervock
Drumcrottagh
Glebe
Gracehill
Islandahoe
Knockanboy
Knockavallan
Lisconnan
Lisnabraugh
Livery Lower
Livery Upper
Mostragee
Mullaghduff
Stroan Lower
Stroan Upper
Tullybane

See also 
List of townlands in County Antrim
List of civil parishes of County Antrim
List of towns and villages in Northern Ireland

References

Townlands of County Antrim
 
Villages in County Antrim